Santiago Agustín Bianchi Paredes (born 29 September 1983) is an Argentine footballer striker who plays for CA Fénix.

Club career
Bianchi started his football career at the youth divisions of Club Atlético Platense. In 2003, he made his official debut in the Argentine Primera with Vélez Sársfield against Estudiantes de La Plata on 29 June. At Vélez he struggled to gain a consistent first-team place, and after two years with the club he was loaned to Quilmes, where his frustrations continued making only 4 league appearances for the cerveceros. During 2006 Bianchi had his first international experience with Bolivian club Oriente Petrolero, before returning to Argentina to play on loan for Tiro Federal in the second semester of that year, and later for his developmental team Platense, which he confessed being a loyal fan of. Since his contract with Vélez ended in 2007, he chose to play for Spanish side Pontevedra CF, where he remained for a year. In 2008, he was repatriated to Argentina by Club Atlético Atlanta of the Primera B Metropolitana. In July 2009, Bianchi signed for Ecuatorian team Deportivo Olmedo, thus making his third excursion abroad. In January 2010,Bianchi signed for Aias Salamina F.C.

Club titles

References

External links
 Argentine Primera statistics  
 BDFA profile 
 

1983 births
Living people
Footballers from Buenos Aires
Association football forwards
Argentine footballers
Argentine expatriate footballers
Club Atlético Vélez Sarsfield footballers
Quilmes Atlético Club footballers
Tiro Federal footballers
Club Atlético Platense footballers
A.S. Sambenedettese players
Club Atlético Atlanta footballers
Oriente Petrolero players
Pontevedra CF footballers
Everton de Viña del Mar footballers
Expatriate footballers in Chile
Expatriate footballers in Bolivia
Expatriate footballers in Ecuador
Expatriate footballers in Spain
Expatriate footballers in Italy
Argentine Primera División players
Primera B de Chile players
Argentine expatriate sportspeople in Chile
Argentine expatriate sportspeople in Bolivia
Argentine expatriate sportspeople in Ecuador
Argentine expatriate sportspeople in Italy
Argentine expatriate sportspeople in Spain